There are several places named Yellow Springs in the U.S. state of Pennsylvania, including:

Yellow Springs, Blair County, Pennsylvania
Yellow Springs, Chester County, Pennsylvania